Steve Waugh is a former cricketer and captain of the Australia cricket team. He is a right-handed middle order batsman and a right-arm medium bowler. Described as one of the most consistent batsmen, and by Indian cricketer Rahul Dravid as "a gritty player who did not throw away his wicket easily and is someone who valued his wicket", Waugh scored centuries (scores of 100 or more) in both Test and One Day International (ODI) matches organised by the International Cricket Council (ICC). During his career in international cricket he scored centuries on 35 occasions and half centuries on 95 occasions. Considered to be one of the greatest modern day cricket captains, Waugh led Australia to 41 wins out of the 57 Test matches under his captaincy. "He was named Cricketer of the Year in 1988 by Indian Cricket, and a year later by Wisden. In January 2010, the ICC inducted him into the ICC Cricket Hall of Fame.

Waugh made his Test debut against India in December 1985, and scored a century for the first time in a match against England in 1989 which Australia won. In Test matches, Waugh has scored centuries against all Test cricket playing nations, the second player to do so. He has scored a century in at least one cricket ground of all Test cricket playing nations, except Sri Lanka and Bangladesh. He has made scores of 150-plus in an innings on 14 occasions. His career best score of 200—his only double century—came against West Indies in April 1995. Waugh has been most successful against England, scoring ten centuries against them, the first in 1989 and the last one in 2003. On 25 July 2003 he became the first player to score 150 runs in an innings against all Test-playing nations, a world record. He has been dismissed ten times between scores of 90 and 99, the most by any batsman. As of August 2015, Waugh is ninth in the list of leading century makers in Test cricket.

Although he made his ODI debut in January 1986, it was not until 1996 that Waugh scored his first century, when he made 102 against Sri Lanka in a match which Australia lost. He went on to score centuries on two more occasions until the end of his career. His highest score of 120 came against South Africa during the 1999 Cricket World Cup; the innings ensured Australia's victory and earned him a Man of the match award. Having played for Australia for nineteen years, Waugh retired from international cricket after the final Test of the 2003–04 series against India.

Key

Test cricket centuries

ODI cricket centuries

Notes

References

External links
 Player Profile of Steve Waugh from CricketArchive

Waugh, Steve
Waugh., Steve